My Secret Hotel is a 2014 South Korean mystery-romantic comedy television series starring Yoo In-na, Jin Yi-han, Namkoong Min and Lee Young-eun. It aired on tvN from August 18 to October 14, 2014 on Mondays and Tuesdays at 23:00 (KST) time slot for 16 episodes.

Synopsis
Nam Sang-hyo (Yoo In-na) is the head of the wedding planning division of The Secret Hotel, one of Korea's most elite and luxurious hotels and considered among the top wedding destinations in the country. Optimistic, cheerful and a perfectionist, she works hard and dreams of becoming the hotel's general manager someday. Sang-hyo faces the biggest challenge of her job when her next client turns out to be architect Gu Hae-young (Jin Yi-han), her ex-husband. Seven years ago, Sang-hyo and Hae-young fell madly in love and got hitched in Las Vegas, but because of Hae-young's easy-come-easy-go attitude towards relationships, they fought and broke up. Since the marriage lasted only 100 days, they never filed the paperwork to legally register it, so their short-lived marriage remains a secret.

Meanwhile, Sang-hyo has caught the eye of her boss Jo Sung-gyeom (Namkoong Min), a strict but thoughtful hotel managing director who has all the female employees swooning. But there's also ambitious public relations manager Yeo Eun-joo (Lee Young-eun), who competes with Sang-hyo for both a promotion and Sung-gyeom's heart.

To make matters even more complicated, a murder turns the hotel topsy-turvy. Sung-gyeom may be connected to the case, while Eun-joo attempts to use the circumstances surrounding the murder to get a leg up on the corporate ladder. As Sang-hyo and Hae-young juggle their sudden reunion under awkward circumstances, the exes also get sucked into the murder investigation.

Cast

Main
 Yoo In-na as Nam Sang-hyo
 Jin Yi-han as Gu Hae-young
 Namkoong Min as Jo Sung-gyeom
 Lee Young-eun as Yeo Eun-joo

Supporting
 Ha Yeon-joo as Jung Soo-ah, Gu Hae-young's fiancée.
 Choi Jung-won as Yoo Shi-chan, Gu Hae-young's best friend.
 Hwang So-hee as Joo Jung-eun, Gu Hae-young's stalker.
 Kim Jae-seung as Kim Ki-ho, Jung Soo-ah's chauffeur.
 Choi Jung-woo as Lee Moo-yang, general manager of The Secret Hotel.
 Uhm Soo-jung as Yang Kyung-hee, employee of wedding planning division of The Secret Hotel.
 Kim Bo-mi as Heo Young-mi, employee of wedding planning division of The Secret Hotel.
 Choi Tae-hwan as Jang Ki-chul, employee of wedding planning division of The Secret Hotel.
 Go Yoon-hoo as Cha Dong-min, head of security team of The Secret Hotel.
 Ahn Gil-kang as Kim Geum-bo, police detective.
 Lee Kwang-hoon as Simon, Jo Sung-gyeom's secretary.
 Kim Byung-choon as Hwang Dong-bae, employee of wedding planning division of The Secret Hotel, murder victim.
 Ahn Bo-hyun as Sang-hoon.

Special appearances
 Hong Seok-cheon as Chef Andre Hong
 Hong Jin-young as herself looking for her husband Goong Min who looks like Jo Sung-gyeom (Hong Jin-young and Namkoong Min were pair in reality variety show We Got Married (season 4) aired at same time as this TV series) – ep. 7-8.

Ratings
In this table,  represent the lowest ratings and  represent the highest ratings.

References

External links
 My Secret Hotel official tvN website 
 
 

TVN (South Korean TV channel) television dramas
2014 South Korean television series debuts
2014 South Korean television series endings
Works set in hotels
South Korean romantic comedy television series
South Korean mystery television series